26th Brigade or 26th Infantry Brigade may refer to:

Australia
 26th Brigade (Australia)

Germany
 26th Airborne Brigade (Bundeswehr)

India
 26th Indian Infantry Brigade

Ukraine
 26th Artillery Brigade

United Kingdom
 26th (London) Anti-Aircraft Brigade
 26th Armoured Brigade (United Kingdom)
 26th Infantry Brigade (United Kingdom)
Artillery Brigades
 26th Brigade Royal Field Artillery

United States
 26th Maneuver Enhancement Brigade

See also
 26th Division (disambiguation)
 26th Battalion (disambiguation)
 26 Squadron (disambiguation)